Flinders County is one of the 141 Cadastral divisions of New South Wales. It is located to the south west of the Bogan River.

Flinders County was named in honour of the navigator, hydrographer, and scientist Matthew Flinders (1774-1814).

Parishes within this county
A full list of parishes found within this county; their current LGA and mapping coordinates to the approximate centre of each location is as follows:

References

 
Counties of New South Wales